Stanley Michael "Bud" Stefanski (born April 28, 1955) is a Canadian former professional ice hockey centre who played in one National Hockey League game for the New York Rangers during the 1977–78 NHL season. He is also a former head coach of the Ontario Hockey League's Barrie Colts and Toronto St. Michael's Majors. His son-in-law is Cory Stillman and his grandchildren are Riley Stillman and Chase Stillman.

Career statistics

See also
List of players who played only one game in the NHL

External links

1955 births
Living people
Canadian ice hockey centres
Ice hockey people from Ontario
Maine Mariners players
New Haven Nighthawks players
New York Rangers draft picks
New York Rangers players
Oshawa Generals players
Ottawa Senators scouts
Port Huron Flags (IHL) players
Sportspeople from Timmins
Springfield Indians players
Toronto Maple Leafs scouts
Toronto St. Michael's Majors coaches
Tulsa Oilers (1964–1984) players
Canadian expatriate ice hockey players in the United States
Canadian ice hockey coaches
Canadian expatriate ice hockey players in Austria